There are six statistical regions in Latvia are Kurzeme, Latgale, Pierīga, Rīga, Vidzeme and Zemgale.

Statistical regions were established according to the main principles set out in the Regulation  (EC) No 1059/2003 of the European Parliament and of the Council of  26 May 2003 on the establishment of a common classification of territorial units for statistics (NUTS) (hereinafter NUTS Regulation), further amended. This NUTS Regulation directly concerns all Member States of the European Union and from 1 May 2004 it is also binding upon Latvia.

The statistical regions of Latvia are not administrative regions, as they have been formed for statistical purposes. Therefore, they are not mentioned in the law that determines the administrative divisions of Latvia.

The structure of Statistical Regions is approved by order No. 271 of the Cabinet of Ministers dated 28 April 2004 "On the Statistical Regions of the Republic of Latvia and Administrative Units Therein", further amended.

Structure

Statistics

History 
NUTS Regulation was established to divide economic territory of EU into similar territorial units for the purpose of collection, compilation and dissemination of harmonised regional statistics in the EU. Shortly before accession to EU, Central Statistical Bureau of Latvia, the Ministry of Environmental Protection and Regional Development and representatives of the planning regions came to an agreement about the structure of statistical regions (order No.271 of the Cabinet of Ministers dated 28 April 2004 “On the Statistical Regions of the Republic of Latvia and Administrative Units Therein”, further amended.)

Statistical regions of Latvia were approved by Regulation (EC) No 1888/2005 of the European Parliament and of the Council of 26 October 2005 amending Regulation (EC) No 1059/2003 on the establishment of a common classification of territorial units for statistics (NUTS) by reason of the accession of the Czech Republic, Estonia, Cyprus, Latvia, Lithuania, Hungary, Malta, Poland, Slovenia and Slovakia to the European Union.

The four statistical regions Kurzeme, Latgale, Vidzeme and Zemgale aligned with the planning regions of Latvia (Regulation No.391 of the Cabinet of Ministers dated 5 May 2009 “On the territories of the Planning Regions.”, further amended), but Rīga and Pierīga statistical regions comprise the territory of the Rīga planning region. After new planning regions were introduced in 2021, the borders no longer align.

See also 
Historical Latvian Lands
Planning regions of Latvia after 2021 reform

References

External links 
 Central statistical Bureau of Latvia
 Ministry of Environmental Protection and Regional Development

Subdivisions of Latvia